The 2014 Amgen Tour of California was the ninth running of the Tour of California cycling stage race. It was held from May 11–18, and rated as a 2.HC event on the UCI America Tour. It began in Sacramento and finished in Thousand Oaks.

Schedule

Participating teams
Sixteen teams participated in the 2014 Tour of California, including nine UCI World Tour teams, three UCI Professional Continental teams, and four UCI Continental teams. They are:

The winner of the 2013 race, Tejay van Garderen, did not participate in this edition as he was preparing to ride the Tour de France. The main favorite for the overall classification is Bradley Wiggins. Other riders competing in the race are Taylor Phinney, Thor Hushovd, Janier Acevedo, Tom Boonen, Mark Cavendish, Jens Voigt, Adam Yates and Peter Sagan.

Stages

Stage 1
May 11, 2014 — Sacramento to Sacramento,

Stage 2
May 12, 2014 — Folsom, individual time trial (ITT)

Stage 3
May 13, 2014 — San Jose to Mount Diablo State Park,

Stage 4
May 14, 2014 — Monterey to Cambria,

Stage 5
May 15, 2014 — Pismo Beach to Santa Barbara,

Stage 6
May 16, 2014 — Santa Clarita to Mountain High,

Stage 7
May 17, 2014 — Santa Clarita to Pasadena,

Stage 8
May 18, 2014 — Thousand Oaks to Thousand Oaks,

Classification leadership table
In the 2014 Tour of California, 5 jerseys are awarded. For the general classification, calculated by adding the finishing times of the stages per cyclist, the leader receives a yellow jersey. This classification is considered the most important of the Tour of California, and the winner of the general classification will be considered the winner of the Tour of California.

Additionally, there is also a sprints classification, akin to what is called the points classification in other races, which awards a green jersey. In the sprints classification, cyclists receive points for finishing in the top 15 in a stage. In addition, some points can be won in intermediate sprints.

There is also a mountains classification, which awards a Polka dots jersey. In the mountains classifications, points are won by reaching the top of a mountain before other cyclists. Each climb is categorized, either first, second, third, or fourth category, with more points available for the harder climbs.

There is also a youth classification. This classification is calculated the same way as the general classification, but only young cyclists (under 23) are included. The leader of the young rider classification receives a white and green jersey.

The last jersey is awarded to the most combative rider of a stage for him to wear on the next stage. It is generally awarded to a rider who attacks constantly or spends a lot of time in the breakaways. This jersey is blue, white and yellow.

There is also a classification for teams. In this classification, the times of the best three cyclists per stage are added, and the team with the lowest time is the leader.

Classification standings

Media coverage
Television
 Europe: Eurosport
 United States: NBCSN

References

External links

Tour of California
Tour of California
Tour of California
Tour of California
Tour of California